Lucjan Emil Böttcher (January 21, 1872 – May 29, 1937) was a Polish mathematician who worked in Lvov in the beginning of the 20th century.

Early life
Böttcher was born on January 21, 1872, in Warsaw, Poland. He attended private schools in Warsaw and graduated from the classical gymnasium in Łomża in 1893, after which he entered the Imperial University of Warsaw in the Division of Mathematics and Physics. At the time, Russian was the language of instruction at the university, as Warsaw was under Russian rule.

He was expelled from the university for participation in patriotic (anti-Russian) demonstrations in 1894. He moved to Lwów Polytechnic School, where he obtained a so-called half-diploma in 1897. Desiring to continue his mathematical education, he moved to Leipzig, where he worked under Sophus Lie. His doctoral thesis, published in 1898, was titled Beiträge zu der Theorie der Iterationsrechnung.

Böttcher married Maria Wolle in 1900, and had four children.

Career
Following his doctorate, Böttcher returned to Lwów to take up a junior position at the Lwów Polytechnic School. By 1911, he was licensed to teach (venia legendi) at the school, and he offered courses on theoretical mechanics as well as mathematics for engineering. All his attempts to obtain habilitation at the University of Lwów failed, however. This meant that he was not permitted to guide doctoral students.

Böttcher was a member of the Polish Mathematical Society. He took seriously his role of an  educator, encouraging the introduction of differential and integral calculus at school level, and writing several high-school textbooks. One example is Principles of Elementary Algebra, adapted to the curriculum in the Polish Kingdom (1911), which followed the so-called Meran programme that aimed to teach students to think in terms of functions.

Main works
Böttcher's most important work was in the iterations of rational mappings of the Riemann sphere. His name is attached to Böttcher theorem, in which he introduced Böttcher's equation and solved it under certain assumptions. He obtained results about the orbits of iterated rational maps, studied their convergence regions (Fatou components) and boundaries (Julia set); he also gave examples of everywhere chaotic maps constructed via elliptic functions. Indeed, his example of rational maps whose chaotic set is the entire sphere predated the more famous Lattès examples by over twenty years.

Academic reception
Böttcher was one of the founders of Holomorphic dynamics, which he viewed as a part of the mathematical theory of iterational calculus. Despite his achievements, however, his early publications were considered insufficient  to warrant a habilitation at the University of Lwow in 1901. Seventeen years later, with more publications to his name, he approached the University again for habilitation, but his request was denied. The committee's criticism focused on erroneous and unscientific reasoning in some of his papers, and cited the lack of clarity even in his expository works.

As Böttcher worked in a mathematical discipline considerably removed from the interests of other Lwów mathematicians, he found little support from his peers. Indeed, his partial results and conclusions were forgotten, and a complete theory came about only decades later following the independent investigations of Pierre Fatou, Gaston Julia, Samuel Lattès and Salvatore Pincherle.

Later life
Böttcher retired from the Polytechnic School in 1935. He died in Lwów on May 29, 1937.

Selected bibliography

Papers

Textbooks

See also 
 Böttcher's equation
 Complex dynamics

References

Further reading

1872 births
1937 deaths
Scientists from Warsaw
20th-century Polish mathematicians